Shark's Paradise is a 1986 Australian television film directed by Michael Jenkins and starring David Reyne and Ron Becks. The film, about police on the Gold Coast, was heavily influenced by Miami Vice.

References

External links
Blog review

Australian television films
1986 television films
1986 films
Hanna-Barbera films
1980s English-language films
Films directed by Michael Jenkins